Yang Weimin (born 10 May 1958) is a Chinese athlete. He competed in the men's pole vault at the 1984 Summer Olympics.

References

1958 births
Living people
Athletes (track and field) at the 1984 Summer Olympics
Chinese male pole vaulters
Olympic athletes of China
Place of birth missing (living people)